Tipper can refer to:

People
 Alfred Tipper (1867–1944), Australian showman, competitive and endurance cyclist and outsider artist
 Benjamin Tipper (1896–1970), English cricketer
 Constance Tipper (1894–1995), English metallurgist and crystallographer
 David Tipper (born c. 1976), British composer and producer specializing in electronic music, known mononymously as Tipper
 Dominique Tipper (born 1987 or 1988), British actress, singer-songwriter and dancer
 Edward Tipper (1921–2017), American World War II paratrooper
 Jim Tipper (1849–1895), American baseball player
 John Tipper (mathematician) (1616–1713), English mathematician
 John Tipper (speed skater) (born 1944), English Olympic speedskater
 Richard Tipper or Tupper (fl. 1709–after 1742), Irish scribe
 Tipper Gore (born 1948), author, photographer, former second lady of the United States, and the estranged wife of Al Gore

Other uses
 Tipper, a beater for the bodhrán or Gaelic drum
 Tipper, a dumper
 Tipper, a civil parish in County Kildare, Ireland
Tom Tipper, a postman in The Railway Series by the Rev. W. Awdry and the spin-off series Thomas and Friends

See also
 Tippa Irie (born Anthony Henry, 1965), British reggae singer and DJ